Blessed Are the Sick is the second studio album from American death metal band Morbid Angel. Though the album features some fast sections, the overall sound is markedly slower than the debut and identifiable classical music undertones (main composer Trey Azagthoth would dedicate this album to Mozart). Tracks 9, 10 and 12 are re-recorded songs from the 1986 demo Abominations of Desolation.

The cover painting is "Les Trésors de Satan" by Jean Delville.

The album was reissued in 2009 as a Digipak in DualDisc format. The CD side contains the original audio release and the DVD side contains a one-hour documentary.

Track listing

Personnel
Morbid Angel
David Vincent – bass, vocals
Trey Azagthoth – guitars, keyboards
Richard Brunelle – guitars
Pete Sandoval – drums
Additional personnel
Tom Morris - engineering, mixing

Release history

References

1991 albums
Morbid Angel albums
Earache Records albums
Albums recorded at Morrisound Recording